Roy Jans (born 15 September 1990) is a Belgian former racing cyclist, who competed as a professional from 2012 to 2021.

Personal life
Jans is in a relationship with 2020 world cyclo-cross champion Ceylin del Carmen Alvarado.

Major results

2011
 9th Grand Prix Criquielion
2012
 1st Kattekoers
 3rd Road race, National Under-23 Road Championships
 5th Memorial Van Coningsloo
 6th Road race, UEC European Under-23 Road Championships
 6th Nationale Sluitingsprijs
 9th Grand Prix Impanis-Van Petegem
 9th Memorial Rik Van Steenbergen
 9th Grand Prix Criquielion
 10th Grote Prijs Stad Geel
2013
 8th Handzame Classic
 10th Châteauroux Classic
2014
 1st Gooikse Pijl
 La Tropicale Amissa Bongo
1st  Points classification
1st Stage 3
 2nd Road race, National Road Championships
 3rd Châteauroux Classic
 3rd De Kustpijl
 4th Paris–Tours
 5th Brussels Cycling Classic
 7th Halle–Ingooigem
 7th Nationale Sluitingsprijs
2015
 1st Stage 2 Étoile de Bessèges
 2nd Brussels Cycling Classic
 2nd Münsterland Giro
 3rd De Kustpijl
 4th Arnhem–Veenendaal Classic
 5th Grand Prix d'Isbergues
 5th Paris–Tours
 6th Grand Prix Impanis-Van Petegem
 8th Overall World Ports Classic
 8th Nokere Koerse
 8th Paris–Bourges
2016
 1st Nationale Sluitingsprijs
 2nd Münsterland Giro
 5th De Kustpijl
 8th Kampioenschap van Vlaanderen
 9th Brussels Cycling Classic
 10th Paris–Bourges
2017
 1st Grand Prix de la ville de Pérenchies
 2nd Grote Prijs Jean-Pierre Monseré
 4th Paris–Troyes
 5th Grand Prix de Denain
 5th Nationale Sluitingsprijs
 5th De Kustpijl
 6th Kampioenschap van Vlaanderen
 6th Grand Prix Pino Cerami
 7th Handzame Classic
 8th Münsterland Giro
 9th Halle–Ingooigem
2018
 1st Stage 2 Circuit des Ardennes
 3rd Cholet-Pays de la Loire
 4th Nokere Koerse
 7th Three Days of Bruges–De Panne
 7th Classic Loire-Atlantique
 10th Gooikse Pijl
2019
 1st Stage 4 Tour of Antalya
 5th Scheldeprijs
 6th Tacx Pro Classic
 9th Gooikse Pijl
 9th Münsterland Giro
 10th Omloop van het Houtland

References

External links

1990 births
Living people
Belgian male cyclists
People from Bilzen
Sportspeople from Limburg (Belgium)
21st-century Belgian people